Hayley Mackey (born 4 May 2001) is a New Zealand judoka. 

In 2022, Mackey won a bronze medal at the Tunis Open. She has been selected to represent New Zealand at the 2022 Commonwealth Games.

References 

2001 births
Living people
New Zealand female judoka
Judoka at the 2022 Commonwealth Games
Commonwealth Games competitors for New Zealand